The Kathleen Mitchell Award is a bi-annual Australian literature prize for young authors. It was established in 1996 and is awarded every second year with prize money originally being A$5000, by 2012 that amount had grown to A$ 15,000 and in 2014 it increased to A$ 20,000. After not being awarded in 2016 it was awarded again in 2019 with a prize money of A$ 15,000.

The prize was established in the will of Kathleen Mitchell with the following aim: "the advancement, improvement and betterment of Australian literature, to improve the educational style of the authors, and to provide them with additional amounts and thus enable them to improve their literary efforts". The price is managed by The Trust Company and a committee of 3 jurors is awarding the price every 2 years. Only Australian authors under the age of 30 are eligible to participate.

The Australian called it a "leading literary award".

Winners
2019 Holden Sheppard, Invisible Boys
2016 No award
2014 Majok Tulba, Beneath the Darkening Sky
2012 Melanie Joosten, Berlin Syndrome 
2010 Nam Le, The Boat 
2008 Randa Abdel-Fattah, Ten Things I Hate About Me
2006 Markus Zusak, The Book Thief 
2004 Lucy Lehmann, The Showgirl and the Brumby 
2002 No award 
2000 Julia Leigh, The Hunter
1998 James Bradley, Wrack
1996 Sonya Hartnett, Sleeping Dogs

References

External links
 Kathleen Mitchell Award, new website
 Kathleen Mitchell Award, old website (archived)

Australian literary awards
Awards established in 1996
Literary awards honouring young writers